Armando Bortolaso (17 August 1926 – 8 January 2019) was an Italian Catholic titular bishop.

Early life 
Bortolaso was born in Italy and was ordained to the priesthood in 1953. He served as titular bishop of Rapahamae and was bishop of the Apostolic Vicariate of Aleppo, Syria, from 1992 to 2002.

See also

Notes

1926 births
2019 deaths
20th-century Italian titular bishops
Roman Catholic bishops in Syria